Sarasa is a rural locality (a selo) and the administrative center of Proletarsky Selsoviet, Altaysky District, Altai Krai, Russia. The population was 1,023 as of 2013. There are 6 streets.

Geography 
Sarasa is located 11 km south of Altayskoye (the district's administrative centre) by road. Rudnik is the nearest rural locality.

References 

Rural localities in Altaysky District, Altai Krai